Biedrzychowice , German Friedersdorf, is a village in the administrative district of Gmina Głogówek (Oberglogau), within Prudnik County, Opole Voivodeship, in south-western Poland, close to the Czech border.

Since 2009, the village, like much of the area, has been officially bilingual in German and Polish.

References

Villages in Prudnik County